Henry Welfare (20 August 1888 – 1 September 1966)  was an English footballer and teacher who lived in Rio de Janeiro, Brazil.

Fluminense Football Club
He arrived at Rio de Janeiro on 9 August 1913 to work as an English teacher on the Anglo-Brazilian Gym. Soon after, he started to play football for the Fluminense Football Club. He did wonders as a striker in his first training session and was quickly invited to join the squad. He played with Fluminense for 10 years, up to 1923. For his loyal service to the club, he was elected a Member For Life of the Fluminense's deliberative council.

Scoring record
With Fluminense, he held the extraordinary record of almost a goal per game, scoring 163 goals in 166 games. Welfare ended his career after scoring the winning goal for Fluminense against Botafogo, in 1924.

External links
Fluminense FC page on Welfare 

1888 births
1966 deaths
English footballers
Northern Nomads F.C. players
Liverpool F.C. players
Tranmere Rovers F.C. players
Fluminense FC players
English football managers
Fluminense FC managers
CR Vasco da Gama managers
Expatriate footballers in Brazil
English men's basketball players
Footballers from Liverpool
English emigrants to Brazil
Association football forwards